Puerta del Ángel (Angel's Gate) is a station on Line 6, located beneath the Paseo de Extremadura near the Puente de Segovia (Bridge of Segovia) in the district of Latina. It is located in fare Zone A. The station is named after the Puerta del Ángel neighborhood, which is in turn named after a former access gate to the Casa de Campo park.

History 

The station opened to the public on 10 May 1995 when the Line 6 segment between Laguna and Ciudad Universitaria was opened, converting the line into a circular route.

On 10 April 2006, two maintenance trains collided in the station, causing two deaths and two injuries.

Between 4 July 2015 and 13 September 2015, Puerta del Ángel functioned as a temporary terminus for Line 6 when the line was closed between Puerta del Ángel and Oporto for maintenance.

References 

Line 6 (Madrid Metro) stations
Railway stations in Spain opened in 1995